Graceway Sports Complex is a multi-use sporting facilities in Providenciales, Turks and Caicos Islands. It is currently used for indoor and outdoor activities including athletics, soccer, basketball, volleyball, tennis, squash, hockey and martial arts. Also rugby union matches played at Astroturf Football Field.

References

External links 
 Official site
 Wikimapia

Indoor arenas in the Turks and Caicos Islands
Football venues in the Turks and Caicos Islands
Athletics (track and field) venues in the Turks and Caicos Islands
Rugby union stadiums in the Turks and Caicos Islands
Buildings and structures in Providenciales